The Sharjah Museums Authority (SMA), formerly named Sharjah Museums Department (SMD), is a government agency in Sharjah, United Arab Emirates.

The organization was established by Dr. Sheikh Sultan bin Muhammad Al-Qasimi in 2006. The authority's objective is to promote the emirate's legacy of arts, heritage and culture. It is a part of the Global Cultural Districts Network. SMA oversees a number of museums and heritage sites in the Emirate of Sharjah, including:

 Al Eslah School Museum
 Al Mahatta Museum
 Bait Al Naboodah
 Bait Skeikh Saeed Bin Hamad Al Qasimi
 Hisn Khor Fakkan
 Resistance Monument
 Sharjah Aquarium
 Sharjah Archaeology Museum
 Sharjah Art Museum
 Sharjah Calligraphy Museum
 Sharjah Discovery Centre
 Sharjah Fort (Al Hisn)
 Sharjah Heritage Museum
 Sharjah Maritime Museum
 Sharjah Museum of Islamic Civilization
 Sharjah Science Museum

See also
 Heart of Sharjah
 List of museums in the United Arab Emirates

References

External links
 Sharjah Museums Authority website

2006 establishments in the United Arab Emirates
Organizations established in 2006
Cultural organisations based in the United Arab Emirates
Government agencies of the United Arab Emirates
Organisations based in the Emirate of Sharjah
Museum associations and consortia
Museums Authority
Sharjah Museums Authority
International Council of Museums